Enrico Toti this name has been borne by at least two ships of the Italian Navy and may refer to:

 , a  launched in 1928 and decommissioned in 1943.
 , a  launched in 1967 and decommissioned in 1992.

Italian Navy ship names